Jul i Hasses lada is a 1986 Christmas album by Hasse Andersson, accompanied by the Kvinnaböske Band,

Track listing
I julens tid – 4.12
Varje människa har ett ljus (Mary's Boy Child) – 2.56
Rudolf med röda mulen (Rudolph the Red-Nosed Reindeer) – 2.18
När julkvällen tänder sin stjärna – 3.45
Är det tomtebo tro? – 2.22
Nu tror du på tomten igen – 2.53
Min barndoms aftonbön – 4.30
Knalle Juls vals – 2.20
En vinter länge se'n – 3.37
Det brinner ett ljus – 3.48
Bjällerklang (Jingle Bells) – 2.20
Runda tomtar – 2.55
Jul i Gamla stan (Christmas in New York) – 3.21
Decembernatt – 3.38
Bella Notte – 2.41
Jul i Hasses lada – 2.23
Det är jul – 2.49
Tomtarnas julnatt – 2.45

Other contributors
Peter Berglund – keyboards
Nisse Persson – bass
Mathias Frisk – drums
Johan Pihleke – guitar, mandolin, percussion
Benny Lawin – alto saxophone
Tommy Nilsson – accordion

References 

1996 Christmas albums
Christmas albums by Swedish artists
Country Christmas albums
Hasse Andersson albums
Swedish-language albums